Public domain land is land that cannot be sold because it legally belongs to the citizenry. Public domain land is managed by a public entity—such as a state, region, province or municipality—directly or by institutes or state companies. It is called dominio público (Spanish), domínio público (Portuguese), domaine public (French) or demanio pubblico (Italian).

United States 

In the United States, land is public domain if it has belonged to the federal government since the 13 original colonies bought from indigenous tribes or from other countries, and has not been dedicated to a specific use. For most of the nation's early history, the federal government sought to promote settlement of the expanding frontier by deeding the public domain to states and private interests through the auspices of the General Land Office. The authority for this came under laws such as the Homestead Act, the Timber and Stone Act, and the Morrill Act.

Creation of the first public domain of the United States, the Northwest Territory, began an epoch in American political history. The government decided early to create new states from it, to add to the union in full equality to the original 13 states. Its subsequent expansion, the mode of its administration, legislation for its government, its relation to constitutional questions, the diplomacy and politics involved in its acquisition, its international boundary questions, the enactment of settlement laws, the attraction of immigrants and growth of population, internal improvements and increased facilities of transportation, the discovery of precious metals, and other topics of interest might be cited here in connection with the public domain.

History
During the American Revolutionary War, Congress spent vast sums and the nation was in debt. The government promised soldiers land in lieu of pay. After the Revolution, the new federal government owned all the public land except that within the 13 original colonies and a few non-original states. The land owned by the government was called The Public Domain. The Land Act of 1785 gave land warrants to the soldiers to fulfill the promise. The Act also allowed the Treasury Department to sell land in auctions to the highest bidders. A new surveying system was created. The first auction was held in D.C., but the land sold was in Ohio. Soldiers could not afford to travel to Ohio to see the land, and then back to D.C. for the auction. Soldiers sold their warrants, often too cheaply. The government sold 640 acres at a time, minimum. Small farmers could not afford the prices. Speculators bought the warrants, purchased land, and sold the land in smaller lots to small farmers, at a huge profit.

Later, the government lowered the minimum acres, and sold land on credit, and offered some free land. The government made more money this way by copying the speculators' method. The government gained other land in time. States were then carved out of the public domain. The government has sold or given away over one billion acres of land. 5 million land patents were granted. The Bureau of Land Management grew from the older General Land Office and now controls public domain land.

See also
 Public land
 Eminent domain
 General Mining Act of 1872
 Acquired lands

Citations 

Geography of the United States
United States public land law